Nature Reviews Drug Discovery is a monthly peer-reviewed review journal published by Nature Portfolio. It was established in 2002 and covers drug discovery and development. The editor-in-chief is Peter Kirkpatrick. According to the Journal Citation Reports, the journal has a 2021 impact factor of 112.288, ranking it 1st out of 158 journals in the category "Biotechnology & Applied Microbiology" and 1st out of 279 journals in the category "Pharmacology & Pharmacy".

Reviews are commissioned to specialists and supplemented with glossary explanations for non-specialist readers and illustrated with figures drawn by Nature's in-house art editors. Besides reviews, the journal publishes analysis articles based on existing datasets (e.g. metaanalysis), progress articles that focus on outstanding issues, and perspective articles—typically opinions or historical pieces.

See also 
 Nature Biotechnology
 Annual Review of Pharmacology and Toxicology
 Pharmacological Reviews

References

External links 
 

Pharmacology journals
Nature Research academic journals
English-language journals
Monthly journals
Publications established in 2002
Review journals